Snydersburg is an unincorporated community in Clarion County, Pennsylvania, United States. Snydersburg had a post office from December 31, 1889, to April 23, 2005; it still has its own ZIP code, 16257.

Notes

Unincorporated communities in Clarion County, Pennsylvania
Unincorporated communities in Pennsylvania